The 2019 World Para Athletics Championships was a Paralympic track and field event organised by the World Para Athletics subcommittee of the International Paralympic Committee. It was held in Dubai, United Arab Emirates from 7 to 15 November 2019. It was the 9th edition of the event, formerly known as the IPC Athletics World Championship prior to 2017.

Location
In July 2017 during London 2017 there were reports and speculation that London could once again hold the games in 2019 due to the success of the 2017 event and the 2012 Summer Paralympics. Wheelchair racer Brent Lakatos was vocal on Twitter and drummed up support from other athletes. British superstar Jonnie Peacock closed his part on Channel 4's coverage of the 2017 event by saying "let's have some fun back here in 2019." Prior to the close of bids, UK Athletics stated "Unfortunately, due primarily to scheduled events taking place in the London Stadium in 2019 and the need for funds required to support the bid, we have reluctantly decided that a 2019 bid is not realistic."

Months after the bid deadline, the International Paralympic Committee was still in negotiations with potential host cities.

Official announcement of Dubai as the venue came in June 2018.

2020 Summer Paralympics 

The 2019 World Para Athletics Championships served as a qualifier for all track and field events at the 2020 Summer Paralympics.

Participating nations 
1,365 athletes from 117 countries:

 (2)
 (22)
 (5)
 (8)
 (2)
 (38)
 (5)
 (8)
 (6)
 (9)
 (11)
 (1)
 (1)
 (2)
 (1)
 (5)
 (43)
 (7)
 (2)
 (1)
 (8)
 (28)
 (5)
 (73)
 (6)
 (9)
 (8)
 (3)
 (11)
 (14)
 (10)
 (1)
 (2)
 (3)
 (7)
 (28)
 (1)
 (2)
 (34)
 (3)
 (42)
 (27)
 (1)
 (4)
 (7)
 (3)
 (32)
 (18)
 (9)
 Ireland (11)
 (17)
 (1)
 (17)
 (9)
 (43)
 (4)
 (6)
 (16)
 (8)
 (1)
 (2)
 (5)
 (2)
 (8)
 (1)
 (1)
 (11)
 (2)
 (11)
 (19)
 (5)
 (3)
 (15)
 (13)
 (13)
 (18)
 (4)
 (4)
 (1)
 (2)
 (8)
 (2)
 (1)
 (41)
 (20)
 (5)
 (6)
 (73)
 (2)
 (8)
 (1)
 (4)
 (3)
 (4)
 (1)
 (25)
 (4)
 (37)
 (9)
 (5)
 (10)
 (3)
 (28)
 (2)
 (22)
 (28)
 (2)
 (35)
 (18) Host country
 (62)
 (25)
 (2)
 (14)
 (5)

Schedule
Purple squares mark final heats scheduled.

Medal table
As of day 9, Friday 15 November

Placing table

Source:

Individual medallists
Athletes who have won three or more medals in the championships.

World Records

See also
 2019 World Athletics Championships
 2019 World Para Athletics Marathon Championships
 2019 World Para Swimming Championships

References

External links
 Official website
 Dubai 2019 Results

 
World Para Athletics Championships
World Para Athletics Championships
World Para Athletics Championships
World Para Athletics Championships
World Para Athletics Championships